Kieler may refer to:

Jørgen Kieler (1919–2017), Danish physician, participated in resistance activities under the German occupation of Denmark
Laura Kieler (1849–1932), Norwegian-Danish novelist
Kieler, Wisconsin, unincorporated community in the Town of Jamestown in Grant County, Wisconsin
Kieler Nachrichten (literally "Kiel News") or KN is the only German language newspaper published in Kiel, Germany
Kieler Yacht-Club or Kiel Yacht Club (as it is called in English), one of the oldest yacht clubs in Germany

See also
 Keeler (disambiguation)
 Kiesler